Garrett Basch is an American film and television producer.  He is best known for his work on the HBO limited series The Night Of.

Career
While attending Tulane University, Basch was hired by writer/director Steven Zaillian as his assistant. The pair later formed Film Rites, a production company based at 20th Century Fox.  Their films together include Moneyball and The Girl with the Dragon Tattoo. In addition to scripted content, Basch produced the documentary film Life Itself, for which he won the Producers Guild of America Award in 2015.

Basch was nominated for a Primetime Emmy Award for Outstanding Limited Series in 2017 for The Night Of, and again for Outstanding Comedy Series in 2020 for What We Do in the Shadows.

Filmography
He was a producer in all films unless otherwise noted.

Film

Miscellaneous crew

Thanks

Television

Miscellaneous crew

As an actor

References

External links 

 

Year of birth missing (living people)
Living people
American film producers
American television producers
Tulane University alumni